David John Hunt (born 10 September 1982) is an English football midfielder who is unattached.

Playing career
Born in London, Hunt began as a trainee with Crystal Palace, but made only a few appearances after turning professional. He moved to Leyton Orient in 2003, playing 74 times in all competitions in two seasons. He then moved to Northampton Town, where he was a key player in the club's successful promotion season of 2005–06, with his long throw-in being a prominent weapon in the team's tactical arsenal that year.

Hunt signed for Shrewsbury Town on 15 May 2007, on a two-year deal after rejecting an offer of a contract extension at Northampton. In January 2009, he came to an agreement with Paul Simpson, the Shrewsbury Town boss, on the remainder of his contract and consequently left the club as he attempted to move back down south as his family failed to settle in the area. His spell at the club was littered by injuries, resulting in few appearances over the one-and-a-half seasons he was at the club.

Hunt signed for Brentford on 9 January 2009, on a contract until the end of the season. He scored two crucial goals for the Bees in their promotion campaign including a well-struck free kick against Gillingham. He signed a new two-year contract in June 2009.

He signed for Crawley Town on 31 December 2010, initially on a one-month loan, with a view to a permanent move being completed at the end of January 2011. He made his debut for the club the next day as a 63rd-minute substitute against Eastbourne Borough. Hunt assisted Crawley to the Conference title in 2010–11. At the end of the season, after a successful loan, Hunt signed for Crawley permanently on a two-year deal.

In June 2013, after leaving Crawley by mutual consent, he signed for Oxford United. On 31 October 2014 he was loaned to Barnet until January 2015.

On 2 February 2015, Hunt left Oxford United by mutual consent.

After turning down an opportunity from Dean Saunders to return to the professional game with Crawley Town, Hunt co-founded the Bean Team: a new distribution network for a premium healthy brand of Organo coffee. He also briefly signed for National League South side Maidenhead United, before joining Margate in June 2015.

On 1 June 2016, Hunt signed for National League South rivals Wealdstone. After one season at Grosvenor Vale, the midfielder penned another one-season deal with The Stones in June 2017.

Honours
Northampton Town
Football League Two second-place promotion: 2005–06

Brentford
Football League Two: 2008–09

Crawley Town
Football Conference: 2010–11
Football League Two third-place promotion: 2011–12

Career statistics

References

External links

1982 births
Living people
Footballers from Dulwich
English footballers
Association football midfielders
Crystal Palace F.C. players
Leyton Orient F.C. players
Northampton Town F.C. players
Shrewsbury Town F.C. players
Brentford F.C. players
Barnet F.C. players
Crawley Town F.C. players
Margate F.C. players
Wealdstone F.C. players
English Football League players
National League (English football) players